Patrick Sang (born 11 April 1964) is a Kenyan running coach and retired steeplechase runner.

Sang won three silver medals in major 3000 m steeplechase competitions:
1991 World Championships in Athletics
1992 Barcelona Summer Olympics
1993 World Championships in Athletics

He won the gold medal at the 1987 All-Africa Games held in Kenya.

His 3000 m steeplechase personal best is 8:03.41, set in 1997. In the late 1990s he also competed in marathon and half marathon races.

Collegiately, he competed for the Texas Longhorns.

Sang is the coach of Eliud Kipchoge, the 2016 and 2020 Olympic marathon champion who broke the marathon world record in 2018 and 2022 and also became the first man to run the marathon distance in under 2 hours, and Faith Kipyegon, double Olympic and world 1500 metres champion.

References

External links

1964 births
Living people
Kenyan male middle-distance runners
Kenyan male long-distance runners
Athletes (track and field) at the 1988 Summer Olympics
Athletes (track and field) at the 1992 Summer Olympics
Olympic athletes of Kenya
Olympic silver medalists for Kenya
Kenyan male steeplechase runners
World Athletics Championships medalists
People from Nandi County
Medalists at the 1992 Summer Olympics
Olympic silver medalists in athletics (track and field)
African Games gold medalists for Kenya
African Games medalists in athletics (track and field)
Universiade medalists in athletics (track and field)
Athletes (track and field) at the 1987 All-Africa Games
Universiade gold medalists for Kenya
Medalists at the 1989 Summer Universiade